The United States District Court for the District of Wyoming (in case citations, D. Wyo.)  is the federal district court whose jurisdiction comprises the state of Wyoming and those portions of Yellowstone National Park situated in Montana and Idaho; it is the only federal court district that includes portions of more than one state. Law professor Brian C. Kalt has argued that it may be impossible to impanel a jury in compliance with the Vicinage Clause of the Sixth Amendment to the United States Constitution for a crime committed solely in the Idaho portion of the park (and that it would be difficult to do so for a crime committed solely in the Montana portion). The court has locations in Cheyenne and Casper.

Appeals from this court are heard by the United States Court of Appeals for the Tenth Circuit (except for patent claims and claims against the U.S. government under the Tucker Act, which are appealed to the Federal Circuit).

The United States Attorney's Office for the District of Wyoming represents the United States in civil and criminal litigation in the court.  As of  the Acting United States Attorney is 	Nicholas Vassallo.

Current judges
:

Vacancies and pending nominations

Former judges

Chief judges

Succession of seats

United States Attorneys for the District of Wyoming 
U.S. Attorneys for Wyoming including the Wyoming Territory:

See also
 Courts of Wyoming
 List of current United States district judges
 List of United States federal courthouses in Wyoming
 United States Court of Appeals for the Tenth Circuit

References

Footnotes

External links
 United States District Court for the District of Wyoming Official Website

Wyoming
Wyoming law
Cheyenne, Wyoming
Casper, Wyoming
1890 establishments in Wyoming
Courthouses in Wyoming
Courts and tribunals established in 1890